Johann Christian Innocenz Bonaventura Cannabich (28 December 1731 (bapt.) – 20 January 1798), was a German violinist, composer, and Kapellmeister of the Classical era. A composer of some 200 works, he continued the legacy of Johann Stamitz and helped turn the Mannheim orchestra into what Charles Burney described as "the most complete and best disciplined in Europe.". The orchestra was particularly noted for the carefully graduated crescendos and diminuendos characteristic of the Mannheim school. Together with Stamitz and the other composers of the Mannheim court, he helped develop the orchestral texture that paved the way for the orchestral treatment of the First Viennese School.

Biography

Background
Christian Cannabich was born in Mannheim, the third child of Martin Friedrich Cannabich (1690–1773), a flautist, oboist and music teacher at the Mannheim court. Cannabich's father was the personal flute teacher  of the Prince elector Carl Theodor which in itself created favourable conditions for Christian Cannabich's later career. The family originally hailed from Alsace which through history, tradition and custom has always had (and still has) close ties to the Palatinate. It is possible that Cannabich's father was bilingual in German and French and that Cannabich as a boy heard and learned both languages in his home. This could explain the relative ease with which Cannabich later moved in French aristocratic circles during his frequent stays in Paris and Versailles.

1742–1756 Education in Mannheim and Rome
As a boy, he studied violin with Johann Stamitz (1717–1757), composer, violinist, concertmaster and leader of the Mannheim court orchestra. He joined the violin section of the orchestra as a scholar (i.e. aspirant) at age twelve (1744), becoming a full member two years later. In the year 1748 he is listed in the annual court and state calendar (Churpfälzischer Hof- und Staatskalender) as a violinist living together with his father in Moritz Lane.

In 1750, Charles Theodore, Prince elector of the Electorate of the Palatinate, sent Cannabich to Rome to continue his studies with Niccolò Jommelli, maestro coadiutore of the Papal Chapel and also a successful opera composer. He remained in Rome until 1753, and followed his teacher to Stuttgart after  Jommelli's appointment as Ober-Kapellmeister in the Swabian capital of the court orchestra. In 1756 Cannabich returned to Italy for a second time, this time to Milan, where he undertook additional studies with Giovanni Battista Sammartini.

1757–1773 Concert master
In the spring of 1757, after the premature death of Johann Stamitz, he was called back to Mannheim to assume Stamitz's post as first violinist (together with Carl Joseph Toeschi).

In 1759 Cannabich married Maria Elisabeth de la Motte, lady of the bed chamber to the Duchess of Zweibrücken. They had six children, one of them being Carl Cannabich, later a composer in his own right. From November 1777 until March 1778, their daughter Rose received piano lessons from Mozart, whose piano sonata No. 7 in C major is dedicated to her. Although Cannabich lived very much in the Age of Enlightenment, which allowed and even fostered a certain permeability between the social classes, it was then still unusual for a man of common birth to marry a titled woman. It turned out that this conjugal alliance would have important and far-reaching consequences for Cannabich.

Duke Christian IV of nearby Zweibrücken took a liking to Cannabich and favoured him with support and attention. In 1764 he accompanied the Duke, who owned a palace there, to Paris. Music and musicians from Mannheim were popular with Parisian audiences. It was during this journey that Cannabich met the Mozarts who, then on their family grand tour, spent the time between November 1763 and April 1764 in the French capital. During the 1760s and 1770s, Cannabich visited Paris frequently, had his music performed at the Concert Spirituel, and his symphonies and trios printed there. Most of Cannabich's works after this date were published in Paris.

1774–1798 Director of the Mannheim Orchestra

In 1774 Cannabich became director of the Mannheim court orchestra; as such he not only led the orchestra as concertmaster, but also had the duty to compose the ballet music for the court ballets choreographed by Etienne Lauchery, the Maître de Danse (court ballet master). Four years later (1778) he moved with the court to Munich when Charles Theodore, his lord and master, became elector of Bavaria. Cannabich continued with his duties in Munich as before, but the best years of the Mannheim orchestra were by then all but over.

In the 1780s the elector cut back on the orchestra's budget and reduced the number of musicians from 95 to 55. The musicians complained about cutbacks in payment and reduced income. It is alleged that Cannabich himself had to live on one-third of his former stipend during the last years of his life, which forced the aged musician to go on concert tours and, perhaps for the first time in his life, to do what other, less fortunate musicians had to do all their lives — scramble for money.

Cannabich died while visiting his son, Carl, in Frankfurt am Main in 1798.

Cannabich and Mozart
Cannabich and Mozart met several times over a period of twenty years. The second time was in the winter and spring of 1777-78, when Mozart was on his ill-fated journey, first to Mannheim and thence to Paris. Accompanied by his mother (his father, Leopold Mozart, had to stay behind to earn the money for this costly venture), Mozart had left Salzburg looking for wealth and fame — and above all a position with one of the many German princes. That mother and son interrupted their journey in Mannheim for a longer stay was not surprising. In the late 18th century, Mannheim had the best and most famous orchestra in all of Europe. Excellent musicians and gifted composers (many of them from Bohemia) with a strict and relentless drilling method, not to mention a sumptuous budget from the elector of the Electorate of the Palatinate, had turned what formerly had been just one of many princely orchestras into a mighty and smoothly-running ensemble. Ladies reportedly fainted when the Mannheimers unleashed their roaring crescendo — just one of many orchestral devices that was invented there.

Mozart himself praised the orchestra on numerous occasions. In a letter to his father, he wrote:

"I must now tell you about the music here. On Saturday, All-Saints' day, I attended high mass. The orchestra is very good and numerous. On each side ten or eleven violins, four tenors, two hautboys, two flutes, and two clarionets, two corni, four violoncellos, four bassoons, and four double basses, besides trumpets and kettle-drums. This should give fine music - ..."

Works (selection)
Operas
 Azaki (1778)
Ballets
40 ballets
Orchestral music
 75 symphonies
 3 violin concertos
Chamber music
 12 string quartets
 6 piano trios
 30 sonatas for piano and violin

Discography (selection)
Christian Cannabich: Symphonies Nos. 47 - 52. Nicolaus Esterhazy Sinfonia, Conductor: Uwe Grodd. Naxos 8.554340
Christian Cannabich: Symphonies Nos. 59, 63, 64, 67 and 68. Lukas Consort, Conductor: Viktor Lukas. NAXOS 8.553960
Christian Cannabich: Orchestral Works, Sinfonia in D Major & G Major, Sinfonia Concertante in E flat Major and Concerto in C Major. Kurpfalzisches Kammerorchester, Conductor: Jiri Malat. Arte Nova 74321 61337 2.

Sources
 Burney, Charles. General History Of Music From The Earliest Ages To The Present Period (1789). Edited by Frank Mercer. Vol. 2. 2 vols. New York: Dover Publications, 1957.
 Mozart, Wolfgang Amadeus. The Letters of Wolfgang Amadeus Mozart. Edited by Ludwig Nohl. Translated by Lady Wallace. Vol. 1. 2 vols. New York: Hurd and Houghton, 1866.
 
 Slonimsky, Nicolas, ed. Baker's Biographical Dictionary of Musicians. 5th Completely Revised Edition. New York, 1958.

References

External links

 Christian Cannabich biography (Mozart Forum)
 Christian Cannabich – short biography
 

1731 births
1798 deaths
18th-century classical composers
German Classical-period composers
German classical violinists
Male classical violinists
German violinists
German male violinists
Musicians from Mannheim
Pupils of Niccolò Jommelli
Pupils of Johann Stamitz
German male classical composers
String quartet composers
18th-century German composers
18th-century German male musicians